Lansing ("Lans" or "Lance") Lamont (March 13, 1930, Manhattan – September 3, 2013, Manhattan) was a journalist and author of several books. He is known for his best-selling book Day of Trinity (1965).

Biography
Born into a wealthy family of bankers, Lansing Lamont's father was Thomas Stilwell Lamont (1899–1967), a vice-chairman of J. P. Morgan & Co. Lansing's grandfather was Thomas William Lamont (1870–1948), a J. P. Morgan partner since 1911.

Lansing Lamont attended secondary school in Massachusetts at Milton Academy, where he graduated in 1948. In 1945 his brother Thomas William Lamont II (1924–1945) was a 2nd lieutenant aboard the final patrol of USS Snook (SS-279), lost at sea. Lansing Lamont graduated in 1952 from Harvard University, where he was part of the Hasty Pudding Theatricals. He briefly attended Harvard Business School but left without a degree. He served for three and a half years from 1954 to 1957 in the U.S. Army and attained the rank of 1st lieutenant. He graduated in 1958 with a master's degree from the Columbia University Graduate School of Journalism. He was from 1958 to 1959 a reporter for The Washington Star and from 1959 to 1960 the Congressional correspondent for the Worcester Evening Gazette, as well as a reporter for other New England newspapers. He then became in 1961 a staff member of Time Magazine and worked as a national correspondent stationed in Washington, D.C. He wrote about the assassinations in 1963 of John Fitzgerald Kennedy and in 1968 of Robert Fitzgerald Kennedy. From 1969 to 1971 he was the deputy chief of Time Magazine'''s London bureau. Subsequently he was from 1971 to 1973 the magazine's chief Canadian correspondent and from 1973 to 1974 the magazine's United Nations bureau chief and writer for the weekly World Affairs section. He was a frequent contributor to The New York Times'' op-ed page and appeared as a guest lecturer and panelist on television and radio shows in the U.S.A. and Canada.

He was married to Ada Jung Lamont for 59 years. Upon his death he was survived by his widow, two sons, two daughters, and twelve grandchildren. A memorial service was held at St. James' Episcopal Church in Manhattan.

Books
  
 
 
 
 
 as editor:
 
 
  catalog entry, openlibrary.org
 
  catalog entry, openlibrary.org

References

1930 births
2013 deaths
20th-century American journalists
21st-century American journalists
20th-century American writers
21st-century American writers
Harvard University alumni
Columbia University Graduate School of Journalism alumni
Time (magazine) people